Gekko horsfieldii, also known commonly as Horsfield's flying gecko, Horsfield's gliding gecko, and Horsfield's parachute gecko, is a species of lizard in the family Gekkonidae. The species is endemic to Asia.

Etymology
The specific name, horsfieldii, is in honor of American naturalist Thomas Horsfield.

Geographic range
G. horsfieldii is found in Brunei, Indonesia, Malaysia, Myanmar, Sarawak, Singapore, Sumatra, and Thailand.

Habitat

Description

Diet
G. horsfieldii preys upon small insects.

Reproduction
G. horsfieldii is oviparous. The adult female lays a clutch of two eggs. Each egg measures .

References

Further reading
Gray JE (1827). "A Synopsis of the Genera of Saurian Reptiles in which some new Genera are indicated, and others reviewed by actual Examination". Philosophical Magazine, New Series, London 2: 54–58. (Pteropleura horsfieldii, new species, p. 56).
Grismer LL, Quah ESH (2019). "An updated and annotated checklist of the lizards of Peninsular Malaysia, Singapore, and their adjacent archipelagos". Zootaxa 4545 (2): 230–248. (Ptychozoon horsfieldii).
Rösler H (2000). "Kommentierte Liste der rezent, subrezent und fossil bekannten Geckotaxa (Reptilia: Gekkonomorpha)". Gekkota 2: 28–153. (Ptychozoon horsfieldii, p. 107). (in German).
Smith MA (1935). The Fauna of British India, Including Ceylon and Burma. Reptilia and Amphibia. Vol. II.—Sauria. London: Secretary of State for India in Council. (Taylor and Francis, printers). xiii + 440 pp. + Plate I + 2 maps. (Ptychozoon horsfieldi, p. 119).

Gekko
Reptiles described in 1827
Taxa named by John Edward Gray